Palia Airstrip is an airstrip situated near Dudhwa National Park at Palia Kalan in Lakhimpur Kheri District in the Indian state of Uttar Pradesh, 90 km from Lakhimpur City. It is only used by private jets.

Airlines and destinations 
The airport/airstrip has only unscheduled chartered flights.

References

Airports in Uttar Pradesh
Proposed airports in Uttar Pradesh
Transport in Lakhimpur Kheri district
Airports with year of establishment missing